Mars is a 1968 Soviet science education and science fiction film produced and directed by Pavel Klushantsev.

Story 

Like the previous film Luna produced by Klushantsev, the film Mars was created at the intersection of educational science films and science-fiction. It consists of seven pieces, which tell (based on scientific understanding of the 1960s) of the physical conditions on planet Mars, the possibility of life on Mars and what forms it might take, of Martian canals and "seas" of the Red Planet.

In addition, the film includes the director's fantasy hypothetical forms of life on mars, and of the exploration and colonization of Mars in the near future.

Crew 
 writer and producer — P. Klushantsev
 operator — A. Klimov.
 art directors — B. Alexandrov, I. Egorov
 animation director — Z. Gaylan
 special effects operators — A. Romanenko, L. Doctorov
 special effects artist — Z. Mironova
 composer — S. Pozhlakov
 recordist — P. Levitin
 assistant director — A. Belyavskaya, I. Pavlyuchenko
 operator assistants — A. Gubachev, E. Ostriches
 mounting — T. Berstakova
 editor — I. Zyrin
 directors painting — I. Gol'din, G. Novi

Consultants 
 Academician AN USSRN. P. Barabashov
 Dr. biol. sciA. C. Grushvickij
 Dr. biol. sciL. K. Lozina-Lozinskij
 Dr. geol.-min. sciC. A. Cerpuhov
 Dr. tech. sciM. K. Tihonravov
 Dr. med. sciC. A. Yazdovskij
 cand. biol. sciL. Ju. Budancev
 cand. phys.-math. sciA. N. Dadaev
 cand. phys.-math. sciK. A. Ljubarskij

Art features 
Filmed in typical Klushantsev manner, and synthesizes the two genres — science education movies and science-fiction fantasy.

In the film both animation and special effects techniques are applied.

External links 
 Mars (1968) entry at IMDB
 Е. В. Харитонов, А. В. Щербак-Жуков (2003): Марс at "Fandom"
 

1968 films
1960s science fiction films
Soviet science fiction films
Mars in film
Films about extraterrestrial life
Films directed by Pavel Klushantsev
Soviet popular science films